The King Alfonso XIII's Cup 1924 was the 24th staging of the Copa del Rey, the Spanish football cup competition.

The competition started on 23 March 1924, and concluded on May 4, 1924, with the final, held at the Estadio de Atotxa in San Sebastián, in which Real Unión lifted the trophy for the third time with a 1–0 victory over Real Madrid with José Echeveste netting the only goal of the match.

Teams
Biscay: Athletic Bilbao
Gipuzkoa: Real Unión
 Centre Region: Real Madrid
 South Region: Sevilla FC
Galicia: Celta de Vigo
Asturias: Sporting de Gijón
Cantabria: Racing de Santander
Catalonia: FC Barcelona
Aragon: Stadium de Zaragoza
Levante: Natación de Alicante

Preliminary round

First leg

Second leg

Barcelona qualified for the quarter-finals 1–17 on agg.

Sporting Gijón qualified for the quarter-finals 2–10 on agg.

Quarterfinals

First leg

Second leg

Real Madrid qualified for the semifinals 7–2 on agg.

Real Unión qualified for the semifinals 3–1 on agg.

Athletic Bilbao qualified for the semifinals 7–2 on agg.

Tie break

Barcelona qualified for the semifinals 5–3 on agg.

Semifinals

First leg

Second leg

Tie Break

Madrid qualified for the final 5–3 on agg.

Unión qualified for the final 7–3 on agg.

Final

References

External links
 Linguasport.com
 RSSSF.com

1924
1924 domestic association football cups
1923–24 in Spanish football